Mimicry and Memories is a compilation album by Electric Six. Disc one, Mimicry, is composed of cover songs. Disc two, Memories, consists of demos, B-sides and rarities. It was funded through a Kickstarter campaign and self-released directly to the campaign's backers.

Production 
Following the success of the cover songs recorded as perks in the band's "Absolute Treasure" campaign, the band launched a Kickstarter campaign to raise $25,000 in order to fund the album. It was successful with a total of $64,977 being raised.

Each member of the band chose a song to cover on the Mimicry portion of the album. Dick Valentine selected "Ah! Leah!" by Donnie Iris, Smorgasbord selected "The Look" by Roxette, Da Ve selected "Buckingham Green" by Ween, Tait Nucleus? selected "I Got the Six" by ZZ Top, Percussion World selected "Do You Love Me? by Kiss and  selected Girl Wants To Be With the Girls by Talking Heads.

One specific pledge reward as part of the Kickstarter campaign was to choose a song to be covered on the album. The four songs chosen by fans through this method were "Turn Me Loose" by Loverboy, "Rockets" by Tomas Ford, "Stuck In a Closet with Vanna White" by "Weird Al" Yakovic and "Cat People (Putting Out Fire)" by David Bowie.

As a stretch goal, the project's backers were given the option to vote for an additional cover to be included. The options were "Everywhere" by Fleetwood Mac (which the band were performing in live shows at the time), "Easy Lover" by Philip Bailey and Phil Collins and "In the Dark" by Billy Squier. "Everywhere" won the vote and was included on the album. Due to the tight vote, a second stretch goal was announced allowing backers to vote for one of the two losing songs to also be included. "Easy Lover" won the vote and was included.

Track listing 

Two additional tracks, "White Eyes – Demo" and "Bleed for the Artist – Demo" were originally announced on the album's tracklisting
 but were not included in the original package. The band made the statement that this was due to them sounding almost identical to the finished songs and them deciding that they weren't worth including. Due to fan backlash that this caused, they made the demos freely available to download on the band's official SoundCloud page.

Personnel
 Dick Valentine - vocals
 Tait Nucleus? - synthesizer
  - guitar
 Percussion World - drums
 Smorgasboard - bass (Mimicry, tracks 13, 15, 20-22, 24, 27, 33-36)
 Da Ve - guitar (Mimicry, tracks 33-36)
 John R. Dequindre - bass (14, 16, 17, 19, 30)
 The Colonel - guitar (tracks 13, 14, 16, 17, 19, 21-22, 27, 30)

Legacy 
 The band's cover of "Cat People (Putting Out Fire)" impressed the original song's record label when it was brought to their attention in the rights clearing stage and they were asked to contribute another David Bowie cover to a tribute album A Salute To The Thin White Duke The Songs Of David Bowie. They covered the song Blue Jean which features on the album.
 The songs "Fucking In Another Man's Clothes", "Suitcases" and "WikiLeaks" have since been occasionally performed live at the band's shows as part of separate Kickstarter project pledges. "Cat People" also became a staple of shows during the band's 2015/2016 tour. Following David Bowie's death in 2016, the band included the song in a segment of their New Year's Eve live performance setlist dedicated to musicians who had died in the year, along with "Little Red Corvette" by Prince and "Freedom '90" by George Michael.
 A cover of "WikiLeaks" was later included on Dick Valentine's solo album Quiet Time with it becoming a staple of his live shows.
 A demo version of "Suitcases" was subsequently released on "The Dick Valentine Raw Collection".
 The band performed a stripped down, acoustic version of "WikiLeaks" on their third live album, Chill Out!.

References 

2015 compilation albums
Electric Six albums